José Mendoza y Almeida (1926–2018) was a French illustrator, graphic designer and type designer, known for the designs Photina and ITC Mendoza.

References

External links
Identifont

2018 deaths
1926 births
French typographers and type designers